Syritta natalensis is a species of syrphid fly in the family Syrphidae.

Distribution
South Africa, Zimbabwe.

References

Eristalinae
Diptera of Africa
Insects described in 2005